Talyp Sporty Aşgabat is a Turkmen football club based in Aşgabat. They play in the top division in Turkmenistani football, the Turkmenistan Higher League.
Their home stadium is Köpetdag Stadium which can hold 26,000 people.

External links
Turkmen Futball blog
football for the Peoples. Turkmenistan

Football clubs in Turkmenistan
Football clubs in Ashgabat
2007 establishments in Turkmenistan
Association football clubs established in 2007